South Lismore is a locality in New South Wales.

References

Localities in New South Wales